Friedrich Carl Georg Kaiser, called Georg Kaiser, (25 November 1878 – 4 June 1945) was a German dramatist.

Biography
Kaiser was born in Magdeburg.

He was highly prolific and wrote in a number of different styles. An Expressionist dramatist, he was, along with Gerhart Hauptmann, the most frequently performed playwright of the Weimar Republic. Georg Kaiser's plays include The Burghers of Calais (1913), From Morning to Midnight (1912), and a trilogy, comprising The Coral (1917), Gas (1918), Gas II (1920).

He died in Ascona, Switzerland, and was buried in Morcote near Lugano.

Work
The Burghers of Calais (Die Bürger von Calais), written in 1913, was not performed until 1917. It was Kaiser's first success. The play is very dense linguistically, with its dialogue comprising numerous emotive monologues influenced by the Telegramstil poetics of August Stramm. Like Kaiser's other works of the period, it bears the mark of Friedrich Nietzsche's philosophy, calling upon the modern individual to transcend mediocrity through extraordinary actions; the Expressionist 'New Man' became a commonplace of the genre.

From Morn to Midnight, filmed by Karlheinz Martin in 1920, was written in 1912 and first performed in 1917. One of the most frequently performed works of German Expressionist theatre, its plot concerns a Cashier (played by Ernst Deutsch in Martin's film) in a small bank in W. (ostensibly Weimar) who is alerted to the power of money by the visit of a rich Italian lady. He embezzles 60,000 Marks and absconds to B. (Berlin) where he attempts to find transcendent experiences in sport, romance and religion, only to be ultimately frustrated.

Kaiser's classic Expressionist plays, written just before and during World War I, often called for man to make a decisive break with the past, rejuvenating contemporary society. He eschewed characterization, and particularly character psychology, instead making his protagonists and other characters archetypes, employing highly anti-naturalistic dialogue often comprising lengthy individual speeches.

Kaiser's drama Side by Side (Nebeneinander, 1923), a 'people's play' (Volksstück), premiered in Berlin on 3 November 1923, directed by Berthold Viertel with design by George Grosz. With this play Kaiser moved away from the Expressionism of his previous works. Utilizing a more rounded characterization and more realistic curt, comic dialogue to tell a light-hearted story of an idealistic pawnbroker caught up in the hyperinflation afflicting Germany at the time (the currency stabilization came a fortnight after the play opened), the play inaugurated the 'new sobriety' (Neue Sachlichkeit) in the drama. "Kaiser has left the cloud that used to surround him," a review in the Weltbühne suggested, "and landed with both feet on the earth."

Kaiser's plays, particularly From Morning to Midnight, were highly influential on the German dramatists operating during the 1920s, including Iwan Goll, Ernst Toller and Bertolt Brecht, who drew on Kaiser's use of revue-type scenes and parable, which was influenced by medieval and 16th-century German mystery plays.

Kaiser collaborated with the composer Kurt Weill on his one-act operas Der Protagonist (1926) and Der Zar lässt sich photographieren (1928), also Der Silbersee (1933).

In his later years, he further developed his criticism of the modern machine age that had characterised the Gas trilogy. Imprisoned briefly in 1923 for stealing a loaf of bread during the hyper-inflationary crisis, Kaiser fled to Switzerland when the Nazis came to power in the 1930s (Kaiser went into exile in 1938). There he turned to writing verse dramas on mythological themes, including Pygmalion, Amphitryon, and Bellerophon, and a pacifist drama, The Soldier Tanaka (1940).

The Raft of the Medusa (1945) is a play written in verse that reverses the ethos of The Burghers of Calais in a more pessimistic direction; to avoid bad luck, thirteen children on a life-raft drown the youngest of them. (See the frigate Méduse for the historical shipwreck and The Raft of the Medusa for its famous depiction in art.)

Plays
 1914: Die Bürger von Calais (The Burghers of Calais)
 1916: Von Morgens bis Mitternachts
 1917: Die Koralle
 1918: Gas I
 1920: Gas II
 1923: Gilles und Johanna
 1928: Oktobertag
 1938: Die Gärtner von Toulouse
 1940: Alain und Elise

Selected filmography

Film adaptations
From Morn to Midnight (dir. Karlheinz Martin, 1920) — based on the play From Morning to Midnight
Women's Sacrifice (dir. Karl Grune, 1922) — based on the play Das Frauenopfer
The Farmer from Texas (dir. Joe May, 1925) — based on the play Kolportage
Hurrah! I Live! (dir. Wilhelm Thiele, 1928) — based on the play Der mutige Seefahrer
 (dir. Felix Basch, 1930) — based on the play Zwei Krawatten
The Valiant Navigator (dir. Hans Deppe, 1935) — based on the play Der mutige Seefahrer
The Ghost Comes Home (dir. Wilhelm Thiele, USA, 1940) — based on the play Der mutige Seefahrer
 (dir. Eduard von Borsody, 1948) — based on the story Der Flüchtling
Kolportage (dir. Hans Lietzau, 1957, TV film) — based on the play Kolportage
Napoleon in New Orleans (dir. , 1959, TV film) — based on the play Napoleon in New Orleans
Papiermühle (dir. , 1962, TV film) — based on the play Papiermühle
Kolportage (dir. Hans Jaray, 1964, TV film) — based on the play Kolportage
Der Gärtner von Toulouse (dir. Falk Harnack, 1965, TV film) — based on the play Der Gärtner von Toulouse
Kolportage (dir. , 1968, TV film) — based on the play Kolportage
Kolportage (dir. Peter Weck, 1980, TV film) — based on the play Kolportage

Screenwriter
 Devoted Artists (dir. Erik Lund, 1919)
 Prince Cuckoo (dir. Paul Leni, 1919) — based on the novel Prinz Kuckuck by Otto Julius Bierbaum
 The Golden Lie (dir. Erik Lund, 1919)
 Alfred von Ingelheim's Dramatic Life (dir. Erik Lund, 1921) — based on the novel Alfred von Ingelheims Lebensdrama by 
 The Conspiracy in Genoa (dir. Paul Leni, 1921) — based on the play Fiesco by Friedrich Schiller

Notes

References
 Frank Krause, ed. (2015). Georg Kaiser and Modernity. Göttingen: V&R unipress. ISBN 3-89971-245-5
 
 

1878 births
1945 deaths
Writers from Magdeburg
People from the Province of Saxony
German opera librettists
German expressionist dramatists and playwrights
Modernist theatre
20th-century German dramatists and playwrights
German male dramatists and playwrights
German-language poets
German male poets